Mahans Creek is a stream in southeastern Shannon County in the Ozarks of southern Missouri. It is a tributary of Jacks Fork.

The stream source area is northwest of Winona and it flows north along Missouri Route E past the community of Delaware. It then turns to the northeast and passes under Missouri Route 106 and joins the Jacks Fork just northwest of Eminence.

A variant name was "Manans Creek". Also spelled "Mahon Creek", the creek has the name of the local Mahon family.

See also
List of rivers of Missouri

References

Rivers of Shannon County, Missouri
Rivers of Missouri